The Open Città di Bari is a professional tennis tournament played on hard courts. It is currently part of the ATP Challenger Tour. It is held annually in Bari, Italy since 2021.

Past finals

Singles

Doubles

See also
 Open Delle Puglie

References

ATP Challenger Tour
Hard court tennis tournaments
Tennis tournaments in Italy